The Hellcat is a 1928 British silent romance film directed by Harry Hughes and starring Mabel Poulton, Eric Bransby Williams and John F. Hamilton. It was based on a play by Florence Kilpatrick and made at the Nettlefold Studios in Walton-on-Thames.

Cast
 Mabel Poulton as Hetty 
 Eric Bransby Williams as Stephen Tredegar 
 John F. Hamilton as Bert Stiles 
 Pauline Johnson as Nancy Price 
 Johnny Butt as Lloyd 
 Mary Dibley as Mrs. Price 
 Charles Dormer as Gilded youth 
 Gerald Rawlinson as David Birkett 
 Frank Stanmore as Butler

References

Bibliography
 Low, Rachael. History of the British Film, 1918-1929. George Allen & Unwin, 1971.
 Wood, Linda. British Films 1927-1939. British Film Institute, 1986.

External links

1928 films
1920s romance films
British romance films
British silent feature films
British films based on plays
Films directed by Harry Hughes
Films shot at Nettlefold Studios
British black-and-white films
1920s English-language films
1920s British films